Danny Smith (born November 7, 1953) is an American football coach who is the special teams coordinator for the Pittsburgh Steelers of the National Football League (NFL). His younger brother Ed Smith set the Big Ten Conference record for career passing yardage while playing for Michigan State and later played in the Canadian Football League (CFL).

Coaching career
Smith was away from the Steelers due to COVID-19 protocols prior to a week 12 game against Baltimore Ravens in 2020.

References

1953 births
Living people
Philadelphia Eagles coaches
Detroit Lions coaches
Buffalo Bills coaches
Washington Redskins coaches
Clemson Tigers football coaches
William & Mary Tribe football coaches
Edinboro Fighting Scots football coaches
The Citadel Bulldogs football coaches
Georgia Tech Yellow Jackets football coaches
Edinboro University of Pennsylvania alumni
Sportspeople from Pittsburgh
Pittsburgh Steelers coaches